Ahmad Azriddin bin Rosli (born 10 April 1995) is a Malaysian footballer who plays for Malaysia Premier League club UiTM as a midfielder.

References

External links
 

1995 births
Living people
Malaysian footballers
Malaysia international footballers
Malaysian people of Malay descent
Malaysia Super League players
Felda United F.C. players
Negeri Sembilan FA players
Association football midfielders
Kelantan United F.C. players
UiTM FC players